Emil Johann Wiechert (26 December 1861 – 19 March 1928) was a German physicist and geophysicist who made many contributions to both fields, including presenting the first verifiable model of a layered structure of the Earth and being among the first to discover the electron.  He went on to become the world's first Professor of Geophysics at the University of Göttingen.

Early years
Wiechert was born in Tilsit, Province of Prussia, the son of Johann and Emilie Wiechert. After his father died, his mother, Emilie, moved to Königsberg so that Emil could study at the University of Königsberg. Owing to financial difficulties, he took longer than normal to complete his education and was finally awarded a Ph.D. on 1 February 1889.  In October 1890 he received his Habilitation in Physics and by 1896, he had achieved the title of Professor. In 1898, he was appointed to the world's first Chair of Geophysics at the University of Göttingen.

Career
Whilst at Königsberg, Wiechert was investigating the nature of X-rays and became one of the first to discover that cathode rays are made up of particle streams.  He correctly measured the Mass-to-charge ratio of these particles but failed to take the final step and explain that these particles were a new type of elementary particle - the electron.  Wiechert was also interested in fields outside of fundamental physics and in 1896, he published the first verifiable model of the Earth's interior as a series of shells.  Here he concluded that the difference between the density of the Earth's surface rocks and the mean density of the Earth meant that the Earth must have a heavy iron core.  These were the foundations that one of Wiechert's students, Beno Gutenberg, used to discover the three-layered Earth in 1914.

As part of Felix Klein's efforts to re-establish the University of Göttingen as a world leading research centre, Wiechert's tutor, Woldemar Voigt, was lured away from Königsberg and took Wiechert with him.  He had initially hoped to become a Professor of theoretical physics but was eventually invited by Klein to found the world's first Institute of Geophysics, becoming the world's first Professor of Geophysics in 1898. He would remain there for the rest of his career, mentoring many students who became world-leading geophysicists and seismologists, including Karl Bernhard Zoeppritz and Beno Gutenberg.

Contributions and influence

During his career he made many other important contributions, writing a number of scientific papers, including a pioneering work on how seismic waves propagate through the Earth. He also devised an improved seismograph and created the field of geological prospecting using small, artificially-created earthquakes. Wiechert was also interested in theoretical physics, such as the theory by Albert Einstein. He discussed the role of the ether and related questions with Hendrik Antoon Lorentz and others.

He married Helene Ziebarth, a lawyer's daughter, in 1908, but the couple did not have children.

Awards and honors
 Corresponding member of the Berlin Academy of Science, 1912.
 The crater Wiechert on the Moon is named after him.

See also

 List of geophysicists

References

Angenheister, G.H., (1928). Emil Wiechert. Nachrichten von der Gesellschaft der Wissenschaften zu Göttingen, Geschäftliche Mitteilungen, 53–62.

External links

 
 Emil Wiechert (1861–1928): Esteemed seismologist, forgotten physicist
 Emil Wiechert with his seismograph
 Photographs of the Wiechert Seismograph used in the Lick Observatory from the Lick Observatory Records Digital Archive, UC Santa Cruz Library's Digital Collections
 

1861 births
1928 deaths
German geophysicists
People from the Province of Prussia
People from Tilsit
Seismologists
Academic staff of the University of Göttingen
University of Königsberg alumni